Boloria bellona, the meadow fritillary, is a North American butterfly in the brushfoot family, Nymphalidae. The common name, meadow fritillary, is also used for a European butterfly species, Melitaea parthenoides.

Description

The upperside of the wings is yellow orange with dark spots, lines, and zigzagged bands. The forewing is squared off just below the apex. A dark border on the hindwing margin is lacking on most individuals. It has long palps. The underside of the wings are mottled with orange and purplish-brown. There is a yellowish band that runs across the center of the hindwing. It lacks the silver spots most lesser fritillaries have. The forewing is smudged with orange and brown near the apex. The wingspan of the meadow fritillary is 3.5 - 5.1 cm ( - 2 inches).

Similar species
Similar species in the meadow fritillary's range include the silver-bordered fritillary (Boloria selene), the bog fritillary (Boloria eunomia), and the purplish fritillary (Boloria chariclea).

The silver-bordered fritillary has rounder wings than the meadow fritillary, has a dark hindwing margin border, and has silver spots on the underside of the hindwing.

The bog fritillary is a bit smaller than the meadow fritillary, its wing bases are hairy, and on the underside of the hindwing are a series of bands and patches which are rust red, yellow, and white.

The purplish fritillary is also a bit smaller than the meadow fritillary, and the underside of the hindwings are a deep, rusty red.

Habitat
The meadow fritillary is frequently encountered in wet, open places, including pastures, fields, and streamsides.

Life cycle
The female is the active flight partner. Females deposit greenish-yellow eggs near the host plant on twigs or leaves. Mature larvae are gray and black with small, light colored spines. The chrysalis is yellow brown. The meadow fritillary overwinters as a larva. It has one or two broods per year.

Host plants
Host plants used by the meadow fritillary:
 Northern white violet, Viola pallens
 Common blue violet, Viola sororia

Image gallery

References
 Brock, Jim P. and Kenn Kaufman. (2003). Butterflies of North America. Houghton Mifflin, New York. 
 Shull, Ernest M. (1987) The Butterflies of Indiana. by Indiana Academy of Science. 
 Cech, Rick and Guy Tudor (2005). Butterflies of the East Coast. Princeton University Press, Princeton, New Jersey. 
 Wagner, David L. (2005). Caterpillars of Eastern North America. Princeton University Press, Princeton, New Jersey.

Further reading
 Glassberg, Jeffrey Butterflies through Binoculars: The West (2001).
 Guppy, Crispin S. and Shepard, Jon H. Butterflies of British Columbia (2001).
 James, David G. and Nunnallee, David Life Histories of Cascadia Butterflies (2011).
 Pelham, Jonathan Catalogue of the Butterflies of the United States and Canada (2008).
 Pyle, Robert Michael The Butterflies of Cascadia (2002).

External links
 Butterflies and Moths of North America - Boloria bellona
 Butterflies of America - Boloria bellona

Butterflies of North America
Boloria
Butterflies described in 1775